William Thomas Parr Brymer   (1796 – 19 August 1852) was Archdeacon of Bath from his installation on 1 April 1840 until his death on 19 August 1852.

The son of a colonial administrator, Brymer was educated at Trinity College, Cambridge. He was Rector of Charlton Mackrell; and a Canon (priest) of the Cathedral Church of Wells.

Notes

Archdeacons of Bath
Alumni of Trinity College, Cambridge
1796 births
1852 deaths